Park Ji-yeon (born June 7, 1993), referred to as Jiyeon, is a South Korean singer and actress. She debuted as a member of girl group T-ara in July 2009. The group went on to become one of the best-selling girl groups of all time. Apart from her group's activities, she has also starred in various television dramas such as Soul (2009), Master of Study (2010), Dream High 2 (2012), Triangle (2014), also starred in various films such as Death Bell 2: Bloody Camp (2012), Encounter (2015). She debuted as a solo artist with her first EP, Never Ever, on May 20, 2014, making her the first T-ara member to debut as a solo artist.

Early life and education
Park was born in Seoul, South Korea, on June 7, 1993, from a Korean family. She briefly attended Hyehwa Girls' High School and graduated from Lila Art High School in 2012. She didn't attend university to focus on her career.

Career

2007–2009: Career beginning and T-ara
She and Hahm Eun-jung are the only two members of T-ara to be trained in acting. Instead, the two switched over to singing despite their original intentions.

Park has expressed an interest in modeling. In 2007, when she was 15 years old, she was featured in several pictorials and advertisements for clothing company Smart with Korean boy band SHINee. She collaborated with Davichi and SeeYa on the digital single "Women's Generation", which was released in May 2009, making her the first member of T-ara to appear in public. She appeared in SG Wannabe's music videos "I Love You" and "Crybaby" from their 2009 album, Gift from SG Wannabe. Early on, the Korean media dubbed her as "Little Kim Tae-hee" due to her close resemblance to Kim.

Park auditioned at the Mnet Casting System and joined the company in 2008. She subsequently debuted with T-ara on July 29, 2009.

2007–2013: Acting debut and breakthrough
In 2007, Park starred in Lobbyist. In 2008 Park starred in Ae-ja and Min-ja, in 2009 Park starred in Possessed,in 2009-2010 Park starred in High Kick! 2, In 2010, Park starred in Master of Study, a Korean screen adaptation of Japanese manga Dragon Zakura. That same year, she played the leading role in horror film Death Bell 2: Bloody Camp and starred in the youth drama Jungle Fish 2.

In October 2010, Park became the host for MBC's Show! Music Core, alongside Bae Suzy, Choi Min-ho and Onew. She also became a cast member of SBS's variety show Heroes.

In 2011, Park was cast in the Korean dub of the animated film, Gnomeo and Juliet.

In 2012, she was cast in the teen drama Dream High 2, starring Kang So-ra, GOT7's JB and Jin-young, 2AM's Jinwoon, SISTAR's Hyolyn, and Park Seo-joon.

2014–2017: Solo debut
Park made her solo debut in May 2014, releasing the title track "Never Ever" (also known as "1 Minute 1 Second"). The music video ranked number one on China's biggest music video site YinYueTai for two weeks straight.

In June, Park was cast in MBC's television series Triangle, starring as the potential wife for Yim Si-wan's character. The same month, she began hosting SBS MTV's The Show alongside Lee Hye-ri.

In May 2015, Park was cast in the Korean-Chinese film Encounter alongside actor Lee Dong-gun. In July 2015, she collaborated with 2BiC's Jun-hyung on the song "Summer Love".

In 2016, Park was cast in the web drama My Runway alongside Kang Dong-ho. The drama was released on Netflix in December 2016.

In February 2017, it was announced that Park would be making her solo comeback after three years with a new album. However, album preparations were later cancelled.

2018–present: Continued acting and Senpass
In early 2018, Park and her fellow T-ara members departed from MBK Entertainment following the expiration of their contracts. She later signed with Chinese agency Longzhen Culture Development in May 2018. Park and Vietnamese singer Soobin Hoàng Sơn have released music videos for the Korean version and Vietnamese version of their collaboration track, "Between Us". Jiyeon signed with Partners Park in November 2018 for her domestic activities.

On November 26, it was revealed that Park would release a digital single in mid December, as a thank you gift for fans. On December 22, 2018, Park released music videos for the Korean and Chinese version of her winter ballad track "One Day".

On April 2, 2019, Park was cast in the KBS2's mystery, romantic comedy drama I Wanna Hear Your Song alongside Yeon Woo-jin, Kim Se-jeong and Song Jae-rim.

On December 26, 2019, Park released her second EP Senpass, a portmanteau of "Sense" and "Compass". The EP consists of five-track including the title track "Take A Hike".

On October 7, 2020, it was announced that actress Park will star in a new web drama called “ Next Door Witch J”. She'll take the role of Seo Je Yi as a beauty creator. In that same month of 2020, the news had been revealed that the actress will star another TV series called Imitation alongside Jung Ji-so, Lee Jun-young, Jeong Yun-ho which will air on KBS2 in the first half of 2021.

On July 12, 2021, Park left Partners Park after her contract expired.

On February 18, 2022, Park signed an exclusive contract with AnB Group.

On July 13, 2022, it was announced that Jiyeon will hold her first solo fan meeting , RE:BLoom at 7 PM on the 30th at Yundang Art Hall.

On July 15, it was announced that Jiyeon would be releasing the 2022 version of the song "Torre", the version she sang 12 years ago.

Personal life 
On February 10, 2022, Park announced in a handwritten letter via personal SNS that she and baseball player Hwang Jae-gyun will get married in the winter of the same year. They married in a private ceremony on December 10 at Shilla Hotel. The ceremony was attended by the couple's closest family and friends, IU and Lee Hong-ki sang the congratulatory song.

Discography

Filmography

Hosting

Advertisements 
Shortly after her debut as a singer/actress, Jiyeon was revealed to be a child model who has been active in the industry long before her debut. Jiyeonhas modelled for various brands and shopping malls prior to her debut including SMART uniform advertisement for which she won the "Model of The Year" (Daesang) award in 2008, the commercial featured other k-idols including F(x)'s Victoria, Shinee's Taemin. Park also won the silver award at the APM Model Contest in 2007.

In 2009, Jiyeon was chosen as cover model for the "Love song" compiliation album, a popular 2000s Original Soundtrack album which sold over 2,000,000 copies in South Korea alone. Jiyeon was chosen as model again the following year.

In 2010, Jiyeon was selected as a public relations ambassador of the National Pension Service by The Ministry of Health and Welfare. According to the national tax service the Ministry of Health and Welfare and affiliated organization, Jiyeon was paid a total of 55 Million Korean Won to advertise the service ranking #1 among the highest paid female celebrities.

In August 2016, Jiyeon worked as an advertising model with a cosmetic brand for about 360 Million Korean Won (30 Million per month), the product was a personnilzed mask called "T-ara Jiyeon Couple mask".

Concerts

Awards and nominations

Listicles

References

External links

 

1993 births
K-pop singers
Living people
T-ara members
South Korean female idols
South Korean female models
South Korean women pop singers
South Korean film actresses
South Korean television actresses
South Korean television personalities
People from Seoul
MBK Entertainment artists